The A. Leo Stevens Parachute Medal is named after the ballooning and parachute pioneer, Albert Leo Stevens. It was first awarded to Joe Crane of Mineola, New York, by Augustus Post, at the Early Birds of Aviation banquet, held in the Hotel Carter in Cleveland, Ohio, on September 4, 1948, during the National Air Race.

Winners
1948 Joe Crane 
1949 E. Verne Stewart
1950 Arthur J. Lapham
1951 William R. Lovelace
1952 Harold R. Harris
1953 Amos R. Little
1954 John Stapp
1954 Thomas E. Willson (Special) 
1955 George F. Smith (parachuter)
1956 Helmut G. Heinrich
1957 Robert F. Oakley
1958 Jacques-André Istel
1959 Joseph Kittinger

See also
 List of aviation awards

References

Parachutist badges
Aviation awards
Awards established in 1948